The 2022 Niigata gubernatorial election was held on 29 May 2022. Hideyo Hanazumi was re-elected Governor of Niigata Prefecture.

References 

Niigata gubernatorial elections
2022 elections in Japan
May 2022 events in Japan